Peter Dixon (born 1944) is an English rugby union player.

Peter Dixon may also refer to:

Peter Dixon (economist) (born 1946), Australian economist
Peter Dixon, chief scout of Catholic Boy Scouts of Ireland, 1998–2004
Pete Dixon, character on Room 222 television series

See also
Peter Dickson (disambiguation)